Brahe Field, is a sports ground in Helsinki, Finland. It is the home field for the Helsinki Wolverines American football team and the HIFK bandy club.

References

Bandy venues in Finland
Sports venues in Helsinki